Mac OS X 10.0 (code named Cheetah) is the first major release of Mac OS X, Apple's desktop and server operating system. It was released on March 24, 2001, for a price of $129 after a public beta.

Mac OS X was Apple's long-awaited successor to the classic Mac OS. It was derived from NeXTSTEP and FreeBSD, and featured a new user interface called Aqua, as well as improved stability and security due to its new Unix foundations. It introduced the Quartz graphics rendering engine for hardware-accelerated animations. Many technologies were ported from the classic Mac OS, including Sherlock and the QuickTime framework. The core components of Mac OS X were open sourced as Darwin.

Boxed releases of Mac OS X 10.0 also included a copy of Mac OS 9.1, which can be installed alongside with Mac OS X 10.0, through the means of dual booting (which meant that reboots are required for switching between the two OSes). This was important for compatibility reasons; while many Mac OS 9 applications could be run under Mac OS X in the Classic environment, some, such as applications that directly accessed hardware, could only run under Mac OS 9.

Six months after its release, Mac OS X 10.0 was succeeded by Mac OS X 10.1, code named Puma.

Development

New and updated features
The features of the release include the Dock which was a new way of organizing one's Mac OS X applications on a user interface, and a change from the classic method of Application launching in previous Mac OS systems. It included the Terminal, it was a feature that allowed access to Mac OS X's underpinnings, namely the Unix core; Mac OS had previously had the distinction of being one of the few operating systems with no command line interface at all. Also, it included the Mail email client, its features included the ability to configure the software to receive all of a user's email accounts in the one list, ability to file emails into folders, ability to search for emails, and ability to automatically append signatures to outgoing emails. The Address Book was a new application which had features including exporting and importing cards to and from vCard format, API to interface with other applications, change of address notifications, contact groups, auto-merge when importing vCards, customizable fields and categories, the automatic formatting of phone numbers. TextEdit replaced the SimpleText application with new features. PDF support was added, it allows the user to create PDFs from any application. The OS introduced the new Aqua UI. Several features of Mac OS 9 were ported to Mac OS X, including the Sherlock desktop and web search engine.

Removed features
File-sharing client — The system can only use TCP/IP, not AppleTalk, to connect to servers sharing the Apple Filing Protocol. It cannot use SMB to connect to Windows or Samba servers.
File-sharing server — As a server, the system can share files using only the Apple Filing Protocol (over TCP/IP), HTTP, SSH, and FTP.
Optical media — DVD playback is not supported, and CDs cannot be burned to. However, audio CD burning was added in the Mac OS X 10.0.2 update, roughly 2 months after initial release.

Architecture 

Mac OS X is built on Darwin, a Unix-like operating system derived from FreeBSD. It also adopted a new XNU kernel, derived from Mach, as a replacement for the Mac OS nanokernel used in classic Mac OS.

Unlike Mac OS 9, Mac OS X had protected memory and preemptive multitasking. This meant that if an application's memory becomes corrupted due to a bug, the application would crash without the entire system crashing and needing to be rebooted.

Mac OS X also had support for OpenGL, AppleScript, and the Carbon and Cocoa APIs.

Language support
Mac OS X 10.0 began a short era (that ended with Mac OS X 10.2 Jaguar's release) where Apple offered two types of installation CDs: 1Z and 2Z CDs. The difference in the two lay in the extent of multilingual support.

Input method editors of Simplified Chinese, Traditional Chinese, and Korean were only included with the 2Z CDs. They also came with more languages (the full set of 15 languages), whereas the 1Z CDs came only with about eight languages and could not actually display simplified Chinese, traditional Chinese and/or Korean (except for the Chinese characters present in Japanese Kanji). A variant of 2Z CDs were introduced when Mac OS X v10.0.3 was released to the Asian market (this variant could not be upgraded to version 10.0.4). The brief period of multilingual confusion ended with the release of v10.2. Currently, all Mac OS X installer CDs and preinstallations include the full set of 15 languages and full multilingual compatibility.

Marketing 

Mac OS X 10.0 was not externally marketed with its codename, a practice which began with Mac OS X Jaguar.

On March 23, 2001, the night before the launch day, Apple hosted a launch party in a Micro Anvika store located at  Tottenham Court Road, London. Attendees were provided with live music, along with food and alcoholic beverages. The first 50 Mac OS X 10.0 customers of the participating stores in the UK, including the store hosting the launch party, would receive a free Apple Pro Mouse, while the next 100 customers would be given a commemorative Mac OS X T-shirt. These participating stores also provided demonstrations and offers for Mac products.
Similarly, an Apple Authorized Service Provider (known back then as Apple Specialist), in Cupertino, California, held a launch party at midnight. The first 100 Mac OS X 10.0 customers would receive a free commemorative Mac OS X T-shirt. On the day, the store was completely packed with customers and fans of Apple products. Steve Wozniak, one of the co-founders of Apple, also attended the launch party.

In the US, multiple Apple authorized resellers also held events on the 24 and 25 of March 2001, to coincide with Mac OS X's launch.

A store located in Minneapolis reported that over 60% of their available Mac OS X stock were sold on launch day.

On April 3, 2001, Apple launched an bi-weekly email newsletter service named Mac OS X Product News that showcases the latest software for Mac OS X.

Reception 

The release of Mac OS X 10.0 saw mixed reviews. ZDNet called the new OS "underdone" due to poor performance, kernel panics, with main applications such as Finder causing system freezes. CNET rated Mac OS X 10.0, a 6 out of 10, calling it "more stable than previous Mac OSs", along with compliments on its UI, memory management and speed, but isn't "ready for the masses", due to issues such as the lack of native third-party applications for the platform, missing DVD playback and hard to use user interfaces. David Pogue stated in a New York Times tech column, that while he felt Mac OS X was better looking and easier to use than Mac OS 9 with superior features and menus, it is not yet ready for the average user, as it's not as polished, with missing features such as CD burning (at launch), automated shutdown scheduling, Labels menu.

Release history

System requirements 
Supported Computers: Power Macintosh G3 Beige, G3 B&W, G4, G4 Cube, iMac G3, PowerBook G3, PowerBook G4, iBook
RAM:
128 MB (unofficially 64 MB minimum)
Hard Drive Space:
1,500 MB (800 MB for the minimal install)

Timeline

References

External links
Mac OS X v10.0 review at Ars Technica
 from apple.com

0
2001 software
PowerPC operating systems